The Classified Information Procedures Act or CIPA ( through ) is codified as the third appendix to Title 18 of the U.S. Code, the title concerning crimes and criminal procedures. The U.S. Code citation is 18 U.S.C. App. III. Sections 1-16.

Legislative revision history
The hidden table below lists the acts of Congress that affected the act directly. The years in which the legislative revisions were made appear in bold text preceding the Public Laws that enacted them. The links to the codification and the section notes may provide additional information about the legislative changes, as well.

Applicable executive orders

, Apr. 06, 1982, 47 F.R. 14874, was rescinded by; 
, Apr. 17, 1995, was rescinded after amended by;
, Sept. 18, 1995,
, Nov. 19, 1999,  
, Mar. 25, 2003, was rescinded by;
, Dec. 29, 2009, (current)

Purpose
The primary purpose of CIPA was to limit the practice of graymail by criminal defendants in possession of sensitive government secrets. "Graymail" refers to the threat by a criminal defendant to disclose classified information during the course of a trial. The graymailing defendant essentially presented the government with a "dilemma": either allow disclosure of the classified information or dismiss the indictment.

The procedural protections of CIPA protect unnecessary disclosure of classified information.

CIPA was not intended to infringe on a defendant's right to a fair trial or to change the existing rules of evidence in criminal procedure, and largely codified the power of district courts to come to pragmatic accommodations of the government's secrecy interests with the traditional right of public access to criminal proceedings. Courts, therefore, did not radically alter their practices with the passage of CIPA; instead, the Act simply made it clear that the measures courts already were taking under their inherent case-management powers were permissible.

CIPA, by its terms, covers only criminal cases. CIPA only applies when classified information is involved, as defined in the Act's Section 1.

See also

Silent witness rule - evolved from the CIPA in the late 1900s/early 2000s
Venona project (problems of using decrypted Soviet messages as evidence at court)
State Secrets Protection Act 
Federal Tort Claims Act
Thomas Andrews Drake (Espionage Act of 1917 case involving CIPA arguments)
Joseph Nacchio (case involving CIPA arguments)

References

 Brian Z. Tamanaha, A Critical Review Of the Classified Information Procedures Act, 13 Am. J. Cr. L. 277 (1986).

External links
 18 U.S.C. App. III. Sections 1-16, Legal Information Institute (LII), Cornell University Law School
 Classified Information Procedures Act (PDF/details) as amended in the GPO Statute Compilations collection
 Criminal Resource Manual 2054 Synopsis of Classified Information Procedures Act

1980 in law
United States federal judiciary legislation
United States government secrecy
Joe Biden